Generation is a 1969 American comedy film directed by George Schaefer and written by William Goodhart. The film stars David Janssen, Kim Darby, Pete Duel, Carl Reiner, Andrew Prine and James Coco. The film was released on December 15, 1969, by AVCO Embassy Pictures. It is based on the 1965 play of the same name.

Plot
Nine months pregnant and due any day, Doris Bolton finally marries Walter Owen, a photographer who wants nothing to do with conformity or "the establishment." They want a natural childbirth, at home, with no doctors or drugs.

Her father, ad man Jim Bolton, flies to New York to be by her side. A liberal, Jim believes his daughter is risking her life and the baby's by defying convention. He asks obstetrician friend Stan to assist at the last minute, against Walter's wishes, but when everyone comes out of the childbirth all right, Jim and his son-in-law reach an accord.

Cast     
David Janssen as Jim Bolton
Kim Darby as Doris Bolton Owen
Pete Duel as Walter Owen
Carl Reiner as Stan Herman
Andrew Prine as Winn Garand
James Coco as Mr. Blatto
Sam Waterston as Desmond
David Lewis as Arlington
Don Beddoe as Gilbert	
Jack Somack as Airline policeman
Lincoln Kilpatrick as Hey Hey

References

External links 
 

1969 films
1969 comedy films
American comedy films
Embassy Pictures films
1960s English-language films
Films scored by Dave Grusin
Films directed by George Schaefer
Films set in New York City
Films shot in New York City
American pregnancy films
1960s pregnancy films
1960s American films